Alfred Pyka (28 June 1934 – 10 January 2012) was a German international footballer who played for Westfalia Herne, TSV 1860 München and Schalke 04.

References

External links
 

1934 births
2012 deaths
Association football midfielders
German footballers
Germany international footballers
SC Westfalia Herne players
TSV 1860 Munich players
FC Schalke 04 players
Bundesliga players